Louis-Joseph Manscour (born 20 March 1945 in La Trinité, Martinique) is a Martinican politician.  He represented the island of Martinique's 1st constituency in the National Assembly of France from 2002 to 2012 as a member of the Socialiste, radical, citoyen et divers gauche parliamentary group.

He was a member of the European Parliament from 2014 to 2019.

References
page on the French National Assembly website

1945 births
Living people
People from La Trinité, Martinique
Martiniquais politicians
Socialist Party (France) politicians
Deputies of the 12th National Assembly of the French Fifth Republic
Deputies of the 13th National Assembly of the French Fifth Republic
MEPs for the Overseas Territories of France 2014–2019
Black French politicians